= Thomas Corbitt =

American physicist

- Education: Georgia Tech; Massachusetts Institute of Technology
- Occupation: Physicist

Thomas Corbitt is an American physicist. He is a professor in the department of physics and astronomy at Louisiana State University.

In 2026, Corbitt was named a fellow of the American Physical Society, "for contributions to the development of quantum-optical and optomechanical techniques for gravitational-wave astrophysics".
